DXPQ (95.9 FM), broadcasting as 95.9 One FM, is a radio station owned and operated by the Radio Corporation of the Philippines. The station's studio and transmitter is located at Villa Kanangga, Butuan.

History
DXJM was established in 1963 under Pacific Broadcasting Network, owned by Congressman Jose C. Aquino Sr. It was the second AM radio station in Butuan after Radio Mindanao Network's DXBC-AM. In 1983, Radio Corporation of the Philippines acquired the station and relaunched it as Radyo Asenso.

In 2017, the station moved to FM via 95.9 MHz and rebranded as One FM.

References

Radio stations in Butuan
Radio stations established in 1963
1963 establishments in the Philippines